German submarine U-199 was a Type IXD2 U-boat of Nazi Germany's Kriegsmarine during World War II.

The submarine was laid down on 10 October 1941 at the DeSchiMAG AG Weser yard at Bremen as yard number 1045, launched on 11 July 1942 and commissioned on 28 November.

After training with the 4th U-boat Flotilla at Stettin, U-199 was transferred to the 12th U-boat Flotilla for front-line service from 1 May 1943.

She was sunk off the Brazilian coast on 31 July 1943 by the brazilian PBY Catalina "Arará".

Design
German Type IXD2 submarines were considerably larger than the original Type IXs. U-199 had a displacement of  when at the surface and  while submerged. She had two shafts and two  propellers.

U-199 was fitted with six  torpedo tubes (four fitted at the bow and two at the stern), 24 torpedoes, one  SK C/32 naval gun, 150 rounds, and a  SK C/30 with 2575 rounds as well as two  C/30 anti-aircraft guns with 8100 rounds. The boat had a complement of fifty-five.

Operational history
U-199 sailed from Kiel on 13 May 1943 on her first and only operational patrol; she negotiated the gap between Iceland and the Faroe Islands, before heading south and had crossed the Equator by 17 June, targeting ships in the South Atlantic Ocean. Operating off the Brazilian coast, she torpedoed and damaged the Brazilian armed merchant ship Bury, which returned fire and managed to escape. On 4 July, the submarine was spotted on the surface by the small fishing boat Changri-Lá. The Brazilian boat was sunk with the loss of all hands by gun fire. U-199 had her first and only significant success, sinking the British merchant ship Henzada on 25 July.

Fate
U-199 was found on the surface, off Rio de Janeiro, in position , by three aircraft, a PBY Catalina and a Lockheed Hudson (both Brazilian) and an American PBM Mariner of VP-74 on 31 July. The Catalina, codenamed Arará, hit U-199 with depth charges, sinking her. The pilot of the Catalina was 2º Ten.-Av. (2nd Lt.) Alberto M. Torres, which later went to Italy as part of 1st Brazilian Fighter Squadron. Forty-nine of the crew were killed, although twelve Germans managed to escape the doomed submarine, including the captain. This was possible due to the actions of the Catalina's crew, who threw a lifeboat to the survivors.

Summary of raiding history

References

Bibliography

External links

Ships built in Bremen (state)
German Type IX submarines
U-boats commissioned in 1942
U-boats sunk by US aircraft
U-boats sunk by Brazilian aircraft
U-boats sunk in 1943
World War II submarines of Germany
1942 ships
U-boats sunk by depth charges
Maritime incidents in July 1943